S.H.M.B Noor Chowdhury, Bir Bikrom, is a Bangladesh Army officer who was convicted for the assassination of Sheikh Mujibur Rahman, President of Bangladesh, and for involvement in the murder of four national leaders in the Jail Killing. He is currently a fugitive and is hiding in Canada. The Canadian government has refused to extradite him because he faces the death penalty in Bangladesh.

Career
In 1974, Noor was a major of the Bangladesh Army in The First Bengal Lancer unit. A major of the Lancers, Shariful Haque Dalim, had gotten into a scuffle with the sons of Bangladesh Awami League leader Gazi Golam Mostafa. Officers from the Lancer then ransacked the house of Mostafa. This resulted in those officers including Dalim and Noor of losing their commissions in the army. In May or June 1975 Noor and other officers met with Khondakar Mushtaque to talk about the plot to remove Sheikh Mujib from power. The officers wished to remove the secular government of Sheikh Mujib and replace it with an Islamic law under Khondakar Mushtaque.

On 14 August 1975, the army officers met to finalize their plans for the next day. Noor was placed in the team that was to attack the residence of Sheikh Mujib, the President of Bangladesh. Noor along with Major Mohammad Bazlul Huda shot and killed Sheikh Mujib while he was coming down the stairs.

The attack on 15 August 1975 killed Sheikh Mujibur Rahman and most of his family members. After the coup, Noor was posted to the Bangladeshi embassy in Tehran as the second secretary. In 1996 when a Bangladesh Awami League government was voted to power, Noor was recalled to Bangladesh. He refused to comply with the government order and lost his job as a result.

On 3 November 1975 former acting President Syed Nazrul Islam, former Prime Minister Tajuddin Ahmad, former Finance Minister Muhammad Mansur Ali, and former Minister of Home Affairs Abul Hasnat Muhammad Qamaruzzaman were killed by the mutinous officers in Dhaka Central Jail.

Trial
The Metropolitan Sessions Judge's Court of Dhaka had sentenced him to life imprisonment for the murder of four national leaders of Bangladesh in the 1975 Jail killing case and 11 other defendants were sentenced to life imprisonment; three to death. On 28 August the Bangladesh High court confirmed his life sentence. The Supreme Court of Bangladesh called the jail killing a Criminal conspiracy after confirming the sentences of the accused on 1 December 2015. Majors present in Bangabhaban has asked the jailer at Dhaka Jail to provide the assassins with access to the four leaders.

Extradition
The Canadian government has refused to extradite Noor as Noor has been sentenced to death in Bangladesh. The Canadian government has shown willingness to resolve the issue with Bangladesh through discussions. Canada has reportedly not approved his application for political asylum. Noor has proclaimed his innocence in an interview on the Canadian Broadcasting Corporation.

See also
 Assassination of Sheikh Mujibur Rahman

References

Assassination of Sheikh Mujibur Rahman
People convicted of murder by Bangladesh
Bangladeshi lieutenant colonels
Recipients of the Bir Bikrom
Mukti Bahini personnel